Paralaxita damajanti, the Malay red harlequin, is an Indomalayan species in the butterfly family Riodinidae. It was described by Cajetan Felder and Rudolf Felder in 1860.

Subspecies
P. d. damajanti (Malaya, Borneo, Sumatra)
P. d. lola (de Nicéville, 1894) (Borneo)
P. d. batuensis (Talbot, 1932) (Batu Islands)
P. d. cyme (Fruhstorfer, 1914) (Borneo to Sintang)
P. d. lasica (Fruhstorfer, 1914) ("Bangka"?)
P. d. hewitsoni (Röber, 1895) (southern Borneo)

References

Riodinidae
Butterflies of Indochina
Butterflies described in 1860
Taxa named by Baron Cajetan von Felder
Taxa named by Rudolf Felder